Alla Mikhailovna Gutnikova (born April 25, 1998) is a Russian journalist, human rights activist and actress.  

Alla Gutnikova lived in Moscow. She has been a student at the National Research University Higher School of Economics, and an editor of DOXA Magazine. 

In April 2021, Russian police raided the magazine's office as well as the apartments of several of the editors' families. Four of the magazine's editors, Armen Aramyan, Natalya Tyshkevich, Vladimir Metyolkin and Alla Gutnikova, were then charged by the Investigative Committee of Russia with encouraging minors to take part in illegal activity. Human rights groups raised concerns about the arrests, claiming that they were made in an attempt to suppress freedom of the press in Russia.

The four were accused of committing a crime of the Criminal Code of the Russian Federation (involvement by a group of persons of two or more minors in committing acts endangering the life of minors in information and telecommunication networks (including the Internet), up to 3 years in prison), in connection with the publication of a video message of solidarity with schoolchildren and students of opposition views before the rallies on January 23, 2021. On April 14, 2021, a preventive measure was formally chosen in the form of a ban on certain actions, effectively placing Gutnikova under house arrest.

On April 12, 2022, Gutnikova and her fellow editors were sentenced to two years' "corrective labour".

On August 10, 2022, Armen Aramyan said that all suspects in The DOXA case, including Alla Gutnikova, have left Russia and are safe.

Filmography 
 2007: Thumbelina as elf (directed by Leonid Nechayev)

References

External links 
 Модель недели — Алла Гутникова, редакторка Doxa
 Сто двадцать мгновений весны
 «Бродского тоже судили в 23». Последнее слово Аллы Гутниковой на процессе по делу Doxa
 Statement by Alla Gutnikova, one of the editors of the Moscow student journal DOXA, who face prison sentences for “inciting minors to take part in illegal protests”.
 «Не хочется быть тургеневской барышней». Активистка Алла Гутникова — об уголовном деле против DOXA, активизме и работе моделью

1998 births
Living people
Journalists from Moscow
Russian activists against the 2022 Russian invasion of Ukraine
Russian women activists
Political prisoners according to Memorial
Russian bloggers
Russian women bloggers
Russian child actresses
Russian dissidents
Russian feminists
Russian human rights activists
Women human rights activists
Russian magazine editors
Russian women editors
Russian prisoners and detainees
Russian women journalists
Russian people of Jewish descent
Russian Jews